Machines of Loving Grace is an album by the American band Machines of Loving Grace, released in 1991. The opening track contains a sample from Devo's 1981 single "Through Being Cool". The band supported the album by touring with Swans.

Critical reception

The St. Petersburg Times wrote: "Although the harsh reality of industrial dance music runs amok in 'Burn Like Brilliant Trash (At Jackie's Funeral)', 'Cicciolina', which follows, is gentle, as close to balladry as tech-heads have ever roamed." The Washington Post deemed the band "a synth-based trio that occasionally approximates a hip-hop swing but often sounds like one of those British electro-dance combos of a decade ago." The Oregonian opined that "the group veers from cluttered industrial noise constructs (akin to Skinny Puppy, though milder) to glossy, if eccentric, dance-rock."

AllMusic wrote that "Pretty Hate Machine-style synths are scattered liberally across the album, but the most part it's surprisingly calm and restrained."

Track listing
All tracks by Machines of Loving Grace

 "Burn Like Brilliant Trash (At Jackie's Funeral)"  – 3:12
 "Cicciolina" - 5:27
 "Rite of Shiva" - 4:04
 "Lipstick 66" - 4:53
 "X-Insurrection"  – 3:56
 "Content" - 3:53
 "Weather Man" - 3:51
 "Terminal City" - 3:34
 "Number Nine" - 1:50

References

Machines of Loving Grace albums
1991 albums
Mammoth Records albums